The 1954 Oklahoma A&M Aggies baseball team represented the Oklahoma Agricultural and Mechanical College in the 1954 NCAA baseball season.  The team was coached by Toby Greene in his 11th year at Oklahoma A&M.

The Aggies won the District VI Playoff to advanced to the College World Series, where they were defeated by the Missouri Tigers.

Roster

Schedule 

! style="" | Regular Season
|- valign="top" 

|- align="center" bgcolor="#ffcccc"
| 1 || March 26 || at  || Unknown • Huntsville, Texas || 3–4 || 0–1 || –
|- align="center" bgcolor="#ffcccc"
| 2 || March 27 || at Sam Houston State || Unknown • Huntsville, Texas || 4–5 || 0–2 || –
|- align="center" bgcolor="#ccffcc"
| 3 || March 29 || at  || Rice Baseball Field • Houston, Texas || 12–3 || 1–2 || –
|- align="center" bgcolor="#ccffcc"
| 4 || March 30 || at Rice || Rice Baseball Field • Houston, Texas || 10–0 || 2–2 || –
|-

|- align="center" bgcolor="#ffccc"
| 5 || April 3 ||  ||  •  || 6–13 || 2–3 || –
|- align="center" bgcolor="#ccffcc"
| 6 || April 5 ||  ||  •  || 23–4 || 3–3 || 1–0
|- align="center" bgcolor="#ccffcc"
| 7 || April 16 || Missouri ||  •  || 5–3 || 4–3 || 1–0
|- align="center" bgcolor="#ffcccc"
| 8 || April 17 || Missouri ||  •  || 6–12 || 4–4 || 1–0
|- align="center" bgcolor="#ccffcc"
| 9 || April 19 || Tulsa ||  •  || 13–7 || 5–4 || 2–0
|- align="center" bgcolor="#ccffcc"
| 10 || April 19 || Tulsa ||  •  || 16–6 || 6–4 || 3–0
|- align="center" bgcolor="#ffcccc"
| 11 || April 23 ||  ||  •  || 4–14 || 6–5 || 3–1
|- align="center" bgcolor="#ccffcc"
| 12 || April 24 || Houston ||  •  || 6–0 || 7–5 || 4–1
|- align="center" bgcolor="#ccffcc"
| 13 || April 24 || Houston ||  •  || 11–7 || 8–5 || 5–1
|- align="center" bgcolor="#ccffcc"
| 14 || April 30 || at  || McAdams Field • Wichita, Kansas || 7–1 || 9–5 || 6–1
|-

|- align="center" bgcolor="#ccffcc"
| 15 || May 1 || at Wichita State || McAdams Field • Wichita, Kansas || 7–3 || 10–5 || 7–1
|- align="center" bgcolor="#ccffcc"
| 16 || May 1 || at Wichita State || McAdams Field • Wichita, Kansas || 14–5 || 11–5 || 8–1
|- align="center" bgcolor="#ccffcc"
| 17 || May 3 || Oklahoma ||  •  || 6–4 || 12–5 || 8–1
|- align="center" bgcolor="#ffcccc"
| 18 || May 4 || Oklahoma ||  •  || 2–4 || 12–6 || 8–1
|- align="center" bgcolor="#ffcccc"
| 19 || May 7 || at  || Husker Diamond • Lincoln, Nebraska || 4–9 || 12–7 || 8–1
|- align="center" bgcolor="#ffcccc"
| 20 || May 7 || at Nebraska || Husker Diamond • Lincoln, Nebraska || 1–3 || 12–8 || 8–1
|-

|-
|-
! style="" | Postseason
|- valign="top"

|- align="center" bgcolor="#ccffcc"
| 21 || May  ||  ||  •  || 7–2 || 13–8 || 8–1
|- align="center" bgcolor="#ccffcc"
| 22 || May  || Saint Louis||  •  || 9–1 || 14–8 || 8–1
|-

|- align="center" bgcolor="#ccffcc"
| 23 || May 31|| at  || Clark Field • Austin, Texas || 7–6 || 15–8 || 8–1
|- align="center" bgcolor="#ffcccc"
| 24 || June 1 || at Texas || Clark Field • Austin, Texas || 3–6 || 15–9 || 8–1
|- align="center" bgcolor="#ccffcc"
| 25 || June 2 || at Texas || Clark Field • Austin, Texas || 16–12 || 16–9 || 8–1
|-

|- align="center" bgcolor="#ffcccc"
| 26 || June 10 || vs Rollins || Omaha Municipal Stadium • Omaha, Nebraska || 5–9 || 16–10 || 8–1
|- align="center" bgcolor="#ccffcc"
| 27 || June 11 || vs Lafayette || Omaha Municipal Stadium • Omaha, Nebraska || 4–2 || 17–10 || 8–1
|- align="center" bgcolor="#ccffcc"
| 28 || June 12 || vs Arizona || Omaha Municipal Stadium • Omaha, Nebraska || 5–4 || 18–10 || 8–1
|- align="center" bgcolor="#ffcccc"
| 29 || June 13 || vs Missouri || Omaha Municipal Stadium • Omaha, Nebraska || 3–7 || 18–11 || 8–1
|-

References 

Oklahoma State Cowboys baseball seasons
Oklahoma State Cowboys baseball
College World Series seasons
Oklahoma AandM
Missouri Valley Conference baseball champion seasons